, also known as Demetan the Frog and The Brave Frog, is a 39 episode anime series by Tatsunoko Productions first aired in 1973.

Overview
The story is about Demetan (Jonathan in the English version), a poor young frog living in Rainbow Pond with his mother and father (a toymaker), who becomes friends with a popular and sweet girl frog named Ranatan (known as Pookie and later Hilary in different English versions), despite the differences in their social standings: Ranatan is the daughter of the leader of Rainbow Pond (English name, Leopold), while Demetan and his parents are tree frogs, which make them automatic outcasts in the community. Together, Demetan and Ranatan enjoy many adventures.

Like many of Tatsunoko's series at the time (in particular its predecessor Kashi no Ki Mokku), the show was often sad, tragic and even sadistic, with Demetan having to deal with natural predators as well as the bullies who rule the pond. The well-loved theme song sung by Mitsuko Horie has a melancholy sound.

In addition to its original broadcast on Fuji TV in 1973, Kerokko Demetan was re-run on TV Tokyo in 1982, as a replacement for Don Dracula, which was pulled off the air following the bankruptcy of its production company.

The series became very popular in other regions, such as Asia, Europe (particularly in France, where the entire series was released on DVD in October 2005 ), Quebec, Canada, and Latin America.

All of the 39 episodes were dubbed in Italian and broadcast on Italia 1 from 1982 as La banda dei ranocchi with an original theme song.

The show was fully dubbed to Arabic in the 1980s by Agrama Films, which was based in the US.

English versions
The series has been translated into the English language on two occasions by Harmony Gold.  In 1985, two  feature-length movie adaptations, edited from the TV series, were produced by Harmony Gold. The two movies, called The Brave Frog and The Brave Frog's Greatest Adventure, tell the entire storyline of the series in heavily condensed form. Rebecca Forstadt portrayed the voice of Pookie (Ranatan). The first movie was released on videocassette in 1994 and on DVD in 1999. In 1990, Harmony Gold also translated the 39 episodes into English under the title "Adventures On Rainbow Pond," which featured Dave Mallow as Jonathan Jumper (Demetan). Ranatan is known as "Hilary Hopper" in this version.

Japanese voice actors
Yuko Hisamatsu as Demetan
Mari Okamoto as Ranatan
Hiroshi Ohtake as Ibokichi
Kōichi Kitamura as Amataro
Kousei Tomita as Gyata
Miyoko Shoji as Amako
Shun Yashiro as Kyaru
Yasuo Tanaka as Zari
Haruko Kitahama as Narrator

Extra production information
Broadcaster: Fuji TV
Planning: Tatsuo Yoshida
Storyboard(s): Yoshiyuki Tomino
Writer(s): Jinzo Toriumi
Character Designer(s): Yoshitaka Amano, Tatsuo Yoshida, Masayuki Hayashi
Music: Nobuyoshi Koshibe

References

External links
 Official anime website of Tatsunoko Production 
Tatsunoko anime history/Dementan Information.
 

1973 anime television series debuts
Animated television series about frogs
Fuji TV original programming
Tatsunoko Production